This is a partial list of members of the Ordre des Arts et des Lettres of France.

Members of the Order

Commandeur

Officier

Chevalier

References

External links
 
 Announcements 
Constitution of the order 

 
Ordre Des Arts Et Des Lettres